Olearia lirata, commonly known as snowy daisy-bush, is a species of flowering plant in the family Asteraceae and is endemic to south-eastern Australia. It is a shrub with lance-shaped leaves and white and cream-coloured to yellow, daisy-like inflorescences.

Description

Taxonomy
This species was first formally described in 1812 by John Sims who gave it the name Aster liratus in The Botanical Magazine from specimens grown in "Knight's exotic nursery". In 1917, John Hutchinson changed the name to Olearia lirata in The Gardeners' Chronicle. The specific epithet (lirata) means "possessing furrows".

Distribution and habitat
Olearia lirata grows in moist forest and scrub on the coast and tablelands of New South Wales and the Australian Capital Territory, in eastern Victoria to as far west as the Otway Range, and is widespread and common in Tasmania.

References

lirata
Asterales of Australia
Flora of New South Wales
Flora of Tasmania
Flora of Victoria (Australia)
Flora of the Australian Capital Territory
Plants described in 1812
Taxa named by John Sims (taxonomist)